Bandar Tun Razak LRT station is a Malaysian low-rise rapid transit station situated near and named after the Kuala Lumpur township of Bandar Tun Razak. The station is part of the Sri Petaling Line (formerly known as STAR).

The station was opened on July 11, 1998, as part of the second phase of the STAR system's opening, including 7 new stations along the Chan Sow Lin-Sri Petaling route. At that time, Bandar Tun Razak station was named as "Mulia" station.

Location
The Bandar Tun Razak station is located between the western edge of Bandar Tun Razak and the Salak Expressway, placing the station on a steep slope that drops down from Bandar Tun Razak onto the highway. Due to this precarious position, the station is only intended to serve the Bandar Tun Razak area via Persiaran Ikhlas (Sincerity Drive) (an inner road in the Sri Kota Flat complex of Bandar Tun Razak), as well as neighbouring Taman Mulia (Noble Estate) and the southern fringe of Bandar Sri Permaisuri (Splendorous Queen Town) from the north

The station's inclusion of a sole entrance towards Bandar Tun Razak means other areas on the opposing side of the Salak Expressway, such as Kampung Baru Salak Selatan (Salak South New Village) and Desa Petaling (Petaling Countryside) are not directly linked to the Bandar Tun Razak station.

Design

The Bandar Tun Razak station was built on sloped terrain, designed with a single subsurface ticket area towards Bandar Tun Razak and a platform level below. The station has similar designs with Sri Petaling station. The platform level consists of two side platforms along two tracks for trains traveling in opposite direction, whilst the ticket area's floorspace acts as a crossing between the tracks for access onto both platforms. Both levels are only linked via stairways and escalators, rendering the station unfriendly to disabled users.

The styling of the station is similar to most other stations in the line, featuring curved roofs supported by latticed frames, and white plastered walls and pillars.

See also

 Bandar Tun Razak

References

Ampang Line
Railway stations opened in 1998